No. 91 Group RAF is a former Royal Air Force group.

The group was formed on 11 May 1942 at Abingdon as No. 91 (Operational Training) Group RAF in RAF Bomber Command, it was previously No. 6 Group RAF. On 14 April 1947 it moved to Morton Hall, Swinderby and was amalgamated with and renamed No. 21 Group RAF on 1 May 1947.

Structure
 February 1943 - HQ at Abingdon
 No. 10 Operational Training Unit RAF at RAF Abingdon with the Armstrong Whitworth Whitley V
 No. 10 Operational Training Unit RAF at RAF Stanton Harcourt with the Armstrong Whitworth Whitley V
 No. 15 Operational Training Unit RAF at RAF Harwell with the Vickers Wellington Ic
 No. 15 Operational Training Unit RAF at RAF Hampstead Norris with the Vickers Wellington Ic
 No. 19 Operational Training Unit RAF at RAF Kinloss with the Armstrong Whitworth Whitley V
 No. 19 Operational Training Unit RAF at RAF Forres with the Armstrong Whitworth Whitley V
 No. 20 Operational Training Unit RAF at RAF Lossiemouth with the Vickers Wellington I
 No. 20 Operational Training Unit RAF at RAF Elgin with the Vickers Wellington I
 No. 21 Operational Training Unit RAF at RAF Moreton-in-Marsh with the Vickers Wellington I
 No. 21 Operational Training Unit RAF at RAF Edgehill with the Vickers Wellington I
 No. 22 Operational Training Unit RAF at RAF Wellesbourne Mountford with the Vickers Wellington I, III
 No. 22 Operational Training Unit RAF at RAF Gaydon with the Vickers Wellington I, III
 No. 23 Operational Training Unit RAF at RAF Pershore with the Vickers Wellington I
 No. 23 Operational Training Unit RAF at RAF Stratford with the Vickers Wellington I
 No. 24 Operational Training Unit RAF at RAF Honeybourne with the Armstrong Whitworth Whitley V
 No. 24 Operational Training Unit RAF at RAF Long Marston with the Armstrong Whitworth Whitley V

  February 1944 - HQ at Abingdon
 No. 10 Operational Training Unit RAF at RAF Abingdon with the Armstrong Whitworth Whitley V, VII
 No. 10 Operational Training Unit RAF at RAF Stanton Harcourt with the Armstrong Whitworth Whitley V, VII
 No. 15 Operational Training Unit RAF at RAF Harwell with the Vickers Wellington III, X
 No. 15 Operational Training Unit RAF at RAF Hampstead Norris with the Vickers Wellington III, X
 No. 19 Operational Training Unit RAF at RAF Kinloss with the Vickers Wellington III, X
 No. 19 Operational Training Unit RAF at RAF Forres with the Vickers Wellington III, X
 No. 20 Operational Training Unit RAF at RAF Lossiemouth with the Vickers Wellington III, X
 No. 20 Operational Training Unit RAF at RAF Elgin with the Vickers Wellington III, X
 No. 21 Operational Training Unit RAF at RAF Moreton-in-Marsh with the Vickers Wellington III, X
 No. 21 Operational Training Unit RAF at RAF Enstone with the Vickers Wellington III, X
 No. 22 Operational Training Unit RAF at RAF Wellesbourne Mountford with the Vickers Wellington III, X
 No. 22 Operational Training Unit RAF at RAF Gaydon with the Vickers Wellington III, X
 No. 23 Operational Training Unit RAF at RAF Pershore with the Vickers Wellington III, X
 No. 23 Operational Training Unit RAF at RAF Stratford with the Vickers Wellington III, X
 No. 24 Operational Training Unit RAF at RAF Honeybourne with the Vickers Wellington III, X
 No. 24 Operational Training Unit RAF at RAF Long Marston with the Vickers Wellington III, X

 February 1945 - HQ at Abingdon
 No. 10 Operational Training Unit RAF at RAF Abingdon with the Vickers Wellington X
 No. 19 Operational Training Unit RAF at RAF Kinloss with the Vickers Wellington X
 No. 20 Operational Training Unit RAF at RAF Lossiemouth with the Vickers Wellington X
 No. 20 Operational Training Unit RAF at RAF Elgin with the Vickers Wellington X
 No. 21 Operational Training Unit RAF at RAF Moreton-in-Marsh with the Vickers Wellington X
 No. 21 Operational Training Unit RAF at RAF Enstone with the Vickers Wellington X
 No. 22 Operational Training Unit RAF at RAF Wellesbourne Mountford with the Vickers Wellington III, X
 No. 22 Operational Training Unit RAF at RAF Gaydon with the Vickers Wellington III, X
 No. 24 Operational Training Unit RAF at RAF Honeybourne with the Vickers Wellington X
 No. 24 Operational Training Unit RAF at RAF Long Marston with the Vickers Wellington X
 No. 27 Operational Training Unit RAF at RAF Lichfield with the Vickers Wellington X
 No. 27 Operational Training Unit RAF at RAF Church Broughton with the Vickers Wellington X
 No. 30 Operational Training Unit RAF at RAF Gamston with the Vickers Wellington III, X
 No. 30 Operational Training Unit RAF at RAF Hixon with the Vickers Wellington III, X

References

Citations

Bibliography

091